Strathclyde Buses was a bus operating company in Glasgow and west-central Scotland. It commenced operations in October 1986. Prior to 1986, the council-owned buses had belonged to Strathclyde Passenger Transport Executive (Strathclyde PTE), and therefore were owned by Strathclyde Regional Council. The new company, although still under the control of the Council, was no longer able to rely on the Council for any financial, or any other, help. In 1996 the company was taken over by FirstGroup. Its former operations are now part of First Glasgow.

History
Strathclyde Buses was created in October 1986. It inherited most of its fleet of around 800 vehicles from the former Strathclyde PTE company. A black and orange livery introduced by the PTE in 1983 was used on the majority of the company's buses; single-deck vehicles, which made up less than 1% of the fleet, were painted in a similar livery which also included white. 

At its creation the company operated from four garages at Larkfield, Possilpark, Parkhead and Knightswood. Garages at Gartcraig and Newlands had been closed in July 1986 by SPTE, and the number of employees cut.

Prior to the creation of Strathclyde Buses, competition came to Glasgow in the run up to deregulation of UK bus services in October 1986. Strathclyde PTE brought its deregulated network to the market in August 1986 and the surrounding Scottish Bus Group (SBG) units, Central Scottish, Clydeside Scottish and Kelvin Scottish, also began their networks early. Whilst the SBG units began operating services within Glasgow's city limits, Strathclyde PTE started or extended services to places including East Kilbride, Cumbernauld, Balloch and Johnstone.

In 1992, sixty buses were destroyed in a fire at Larkfield garage; these were replaced by a mixture of new and second-hand vehicles. The company was privatised in February 1993, with a management buy-out taking control despite interest from Stagecoach Group. A low-cost operation, GCT, was set up in 1993 using former Strathclyde Buses vehicles in a new livery of green and yellow. In October 1994 the company took over the former SBG subsidiary Kelvin Central Buses (KCB), formed from the former Kelvin Scottish and Central Scottish operations. KCB was retained as a separate operating subsidiary.

In December 1994 Stagecoach bought 21.7% of SB Holdings, the holding company which now owned Strathclyde Buses. However, a year-long investigation by the Monopolies and Mergers Commission (MMC) concluded that the group should divest the stake as it also owned Stagecoach West Scotland, who also ran in Glasgow. Stagecoach intended to appeal the ruling, but before this could take place an offer to purchase SB Holdings was made by FirstGroup.

SB Holdings, which by now owned 1,300 vehicles and employed over 2,000 staff members, was bought by First in May 1996 for £110 million. The deal made First the largest bus operating company in the United Kingdom. The takeover was reviewed by the MMC due to concerns that First would have a monopoly of services in Glasgow, but was eventually cleared in the summer of 1998 after the introduction of additional competing services by Stagecoach. Strathclyde Buses had been renamed to First Glasgow earlier in the year.

Fleet

Strathclyde Buses relied heavily on the Leyland Atlantean bus, having inherited over 300 at its creation, and the Volvo Ailsa B55, of which over 100 were operated. In 1988/9 it ordered 95 Volvo Citybuses with Alexander bodywork and 25 MCW Metrobuses. Whilst many of the company's competitors ordered minibuses which had van-derived chassis, the company ordered the MCW Metrorider for use on its minibus network. A small single-deck fleet was also operated, including three rare Caetano-bodied Volvo B10Ms.

References

Former bus operators in Scotland
Transport in Glasgow
Companies owned by municipalities of Scotland